Conlon v Ozolins (1984) NZLR 489 is an important New Zealand case involving the legal issues of non est factum and mutual mistake.

Facts
Mrs. Ozolins, an elderly widow from Latvia in her seventies decided to sell three of the four sections that were behind her house in Albert Street in Palmerston North. She did not intend to sell the fourth section, as it was right behind her house and functioned as her back garden. This fourth section was separated from the three other sections by a six foot high fence. The other three sections formed a bare paddock.

Mr. Conlon, the local milkman, soon agreed to purchase these sections. Unfortunately, Mrs. Ozolin's solicitor in drafting up the sale agreement, misinterpreted her instructions and included the fourth section (effectively her back yard, as well as part of her garage) in the sale agreement.

The vendor did not notice this mistake when she signed it, signing the contract within an hour of receiving it. The mistake soon came to her attention, and she refused to transfer the fourth section to Mr. Conlon, where upon he filed for specific performance in the High Court, and won, with the court ordering her to transfer ownership of the fourth section to Mr. Conlon.
Mrs. Ozolins appealed to the New Zealand Court of Appeal.

Judgment
Mrs. Ozolin's claims for non est factum and for mutual mistake were unsuccessful, as she was negligent in signing a contract that although she could not read, she knew at the time it was a contract to sell her land. However she did win under section 6 (1) (a) (iii) of the Contractual Mistakes Act (1977), and the matter was referred back to the High Court for a remedy to the situation.

References

External links
Link to full text of case
Contractual Mistakes Act 1977

Court of Appeal of New Zealand cases
1984 in New Zealand law
1984 in case law
New Zealand contract case law